Gunda is a unisex given name and a surname. In Scandinavia it is used as a feminine given name and is the derivative of the German names ending in -gund such as Hildegund. It was a common name for girls in the Scandinavian countries in the late nineteenth century.

Female given name
Gunda Beeg, German writer and fashion designer
Gunda Georg, American chemist 
Gunda Johansen (born 1952), Norwegian politician 
Gunda Niemann-Stirnemann (born 1966), German speed skater
Gunda Trepp (born 1958), German author and journalist

Male given name
Gunda I (r. c. 815-?), Kakatiya ruler of India
Gunda II (r. c. ?-865), Kakatiya ruler of India
Gunda III (died c. 895 CE), Kakatiya ruler of India
Gunda IV alias Pindi Gunda (r. c. 955-995), Kakatiya ruler of India
Gunda Dhur, Indian tribal leader
Gunda Mallesh (1947–2020), Indian politician

Surname
Ambrose Gunda (died 2007), Zimbabwean military personnel
Benedict Fodo Gunda, Kenyan politician
John Gunda, South African politician
Peter Gunda (born 1973), Slovak football player
Saida Gunba (1959–2018), Soviet javelin thrower

Fictional characters
Mama Gunda, one of the main characters in the movie Tarzan II

See also
 Gunda (disambiguation)

References

German feminine given names
Indian masculine given names
Unisex given names
Norwegian feminine given names